4391 Balodis, provisional designation , is a dark and rare Erigone asteroid from the inner regions of the asteroid belt, approximately 8 kilometers in diameter. It was discovered by Soviet–Russian astronomer Nikolai Chernykh at the Crimean Astrophysical Observatory in Nauchnyj, on the Crimean peninsula, on 21 August 1977. The asteroid was named for Latvian geodesist Jānis Balodis.

Orbit and classification 

Balodis orbits the Sun in the inner main-belt at a distance of 1.9–2.9 AU once every 3 years and 8 months (1,349 days). Its orbit has an eccentricity of 0.21 and an inclination of 5° with respect to the ecliptic. Based on its orbital elements, the Collaborative Asteroid Lightcurve Link (CALL) classifies the asteroid as a member of the Erigone family, which is named after its largest member and namesake, 163 Erigone, also a dark body of carbonaceous composition.

Physical characteristics

Diameter and albedo 

According to observations by NASA's space-based Wide-field Infrared Survey Explorer with its subsequent NEOWISE mission, Balodis measures 3.4 kilometers in diameter, and its surface has an exceptionally high albedo of 0.40. However, the CALL assumes a standard albedo for a C-type asteroid of 0.057 and calculates a diameter of 8.4 kilometers with an absolute magnitude of 14.2, as the lower the albedo (reflectivity) the larger the body's diameter.

Rotation period 

In July 2010, a rotational lightcurve of Balodis was obtained by Italian astronomer Albino Carbognani from photometric observations taken at the Astronomical Observatory of the Autonomous Region of the Aosta Valley (OAVdA) in Italy. It showed rotation period of  hours with a brightness amplitude of 0.29 in magnitude.

Naming 

This minor planet was named after Latvian cosmic geodesist Jānis Balodis, head of the Astronomical Observatory at University of Latvia.

Balodis research includes astrometry, observations of artificial satellites using laser, as well as computational methods for astrometric interpretations of photographic plates. The Crimean minor planet service has used his algorithms for a long time. (The honored astronomer should not to be confused with Soviet army General Jānis Balodis.) The official naming citation was published by the Minor Planet Center on 12 September 1992.

References

External links 
 Asteroid Lightcurve Database (LCDB), query form (info )
 Dictionary of Minor Planet Names, Google books
 Asteroids and comets rotation curves, CdR – Observatoire de Genève, Raoul Behrend
 Discovery Circumstances: Numbered Minor Planets (1)-(5000) – Minor Planet Center
 
 

004391
Discoveries by Nikolai Chernykh
Named minor planets
19770821